Bleuse is a French surname. Notable people with the surname include:

 Marc Bleuse (born 1937), French musician, composer, and conductor
 Pierre Bleuse (born 1977), French violinist and conductor
 Raoul Bleuse (1895–1984), French politician

French-language surnames